KRMW (94.9 FM) is a radio station licensed to Cedarville, Arkansas, United States. It serves the Fayetteville/Fort Smith area. The station is owned by Cumulus Media.

Formats

The 94.9 frequency went through many formats in the 2010s. It started as an adult alternative music format. In 2012 it changed to an adult contemporary radio station as "Warm 94.9." Next, the station flipped to country music under the "Nash FM" umbrella in August 2014. As of 2016, KRMW is an eclectic format branded as "Radio Jon/Deek," named after the only on-air personalities at the station, Jon Williams and Derek "Deek" Kastner.

References

External links

RMW
Adult album alternative radio stations in the United States
Radio stations established in 1992
Cumulus Media radio stations